Korsberga is a locality situated in Vetlanda Municipality, Jönköping County, Sweden with 694 inhabitants in 2010.

References 

Populated places in Jönköping County
Populated places in Vetlanda Municipality